Maverick Entertainment Group is a low-budget American independent motion picture and DVD distribution company founded by Doug Schwab and based in South Florida.

Releases

The Workout Room (2019)
Why She Cries (2015)
Be My Teacher (2011)
 Ex$pendable (2010)
 Spike (2010)
 Director (2010)
 She's Crushed (2010)
 London Betty (2010)
 Treasure Raiders (2009)
 Fast Track: No Limits (2008)
 Bad Reputation (2007)
 Cain and Abel (2007)
 Kush (2007)
 Tweek City (2007)
 F4 Vortex (2006)

References

External links
 

 
Film distributors of the United States